T-cell receptor alpha locus is a protein that in humans is encoded by the TRA gene, also known as TCRA or TRA@. It contributes the alpha chain to the larger TCR protein (T-cell receptor).

References

Further reading

Proteins